Pterolophia afflicta is a species of beetle in the family Cerambycidae. It was described by Francis Polkinghorne Pascoe in 1867, originally under the genus Lychrosis. It is known from Australia.

References

afflicta
Beetles described in 1867